The 2020–21 Anaheim Ducks season was the 28th season for the National Hockey League franchise that was established on June 15, 1993.

On December 20, 2020, the league temporarily realigned into four divisions with no conferences due to the COVID-19 pandemic and the ongoing closure of the Canada-United States border. As a result of this realignment, the Ducks played this season in the West Division and only played games against the other teams in their new division during the regular season.

On April 29, the Ducks were eliminated from playoff contention after the St. Louis Blues defeated the Minnesota Wild. They finished last in their division for the first time since the 2011-12 season.

Following offensive woes the whole season, Anaheim finished with the worst single-season power play in NHL history, at 8.94%.

Standings

Divisional standings

Schedule and results

Regular season
The regular season schedule was published on December 23, 2020.

Transactions
The Ducks have been involved in the following transactions during the 2020–21 season.

Free agents

Imports
This section is for players who were not previously on contract with NHL teams in the past season. Listed is the last team and league they were under contract with.

Trades
* Retained Salary Transaction: Each team is allowed up to three contracts on their payroll where they have retained salary in a trade (i.e. the player no longer plays with Team A due to a trade to Team B, but Team A still retains some salary). Only up to 50% of a player's contract can be kept, and only up to 15% of a team's salary cap can be taken up by retained salary. A contract can only be involved in one of these trades twice.

Hover over-retained salary or conditional transactions for more information.

October

Draft picks

Below are the Anaheim Ducks' selections at the 2020 NHL Entry Draft, which was originally scheduled for June 26-27, 2020 at the Bell Center in Montreal, Quebec, but was postponed on March 25, 2020, due to the COVID-19 pandemic. On October 6-7, 2020 the draft was held virtually via Video conference call from the NHL Network studio in Secaucus, New Jersey.

Notes:
 The Boston Bruins' first-round pick went to the Anaheim Ducks as the result of a trade on February 21, 2020, that sent Ondrej Kase to Boston in exchange for David Backes, Axel Andersson and this pick.
 The Nashville Predators' fourth-round pick went to the Anaheim Ducks as the result of a trade on February 24, 2020, that sent Derek Grant to Philadelphia in exchange for Kyle Criscuolo and this pick (being conditional at the time of the trade). The condition – Anaheim will receive the higher of Nashville or Philadelphia's fourth-round pick in 2020. – was converted when Nashville was eliminated from the 2020 Stanley Cup playoffs on August 7, 2020, ensuring that Nashville would select higher than Philadelphia.
 The Columbus Blue Jackets' seventh-round pick went to the Anaheim Ducks as the result of a trade on October 7, 2020, that sent a conditional seventh-round pick in 2022 or 2023 to Columbus in exchange for this pick.

References

Anaheim Ducks seasons
2020–21 NHL season by team
Anaheim Ducks
Anaheim Ducks